The Hollywood Open was a golf tournament played in Hollywood, Florida from 1936 to 1938. It was played in early March. The 1936 and 1937 events were played at Hollywood Golf and Country Club with the 1938 tournament played at Orangebrook Golf & Country Club.

The Hollywood Beach Hotel Open was also played in the town at the end of 1937. It was won by Leonard Dodson.

Winners

References

Former PGA Tour events
Golf in Florida
Recurring sporting events established in 1936
Recurring sporting events disestablished in 1938
1936 establishments in Florida
1938 disestablishments in Florida